John Henry is a 2000 animation short film from Walt Disney Animation Studios directed by Mark Henn. The short was released on October 30, 2000.

The short is based on African American folk hero John Henry.

Synopsis 
A narration by John's wife Polly explains his early life: said to have been "born with a hammer in his hand," John was a slave alongside Polly until they were granted their freedom and soon married. As a wedding gift, Polly gives John a massive sledgehammer forged from his old shackles and John promises her that he will die holding that hammer. Searching for land to settle down in, they come across a group of other former slaves hired to build railways, with the promise that they will receive land if they complete the railways in a shorter period of time than required. However, the hard work tires almost all the men. John, who has the stamina of ten men, inspires them to keep working and never give up.

Despite all this, the contract is cancelled, as his place is taken by a steam drill. John refuses to back down and proves that man can achieve more than a machine by challenging the steam drill driver to a race for who can finish the railroad first. He builds the railway and even a tunnel straight through a mountain, the steam drill breaking before it can finish. However, the group's celebration turns bittersweet as John collapses from exhaustion. Realizing he won't live much longer, Polly gently places John's hammer in his hand before he passes away with a smile on his face. The short film ends by showing that the story was being told to John's young son in their house in the town that now covers the land that John gave them. The child is scared by some thunder, but Polly tells him that it's just the sound of his father, hammering in the sky.

Cast 
 Alfre Woodard - Polly / Narrator (voice)
 Geoffrey Jones - John Henry (voice)
 Tim Hodge -	MacTavish (voice)
 Dave Murray	- Thomas (voice)
 Carrie Harrington - Singing Voice of Polly (voice)

Home media
The DVDs  Disney's American Legends and Walt Disney Animation Studios Short Films Collection  featured  this  short.  Apart from its DVD release, the short film was only shown in one theatre in the USA, namely Hollywood's El Capitan Theatre. There, the short film was shown six times in three days.

References

External links

2000 animated films
2000 films
2000s Disney animated short films
Films scored by Stephen James Taylor
2000s English-language films